F4 Chinese Championship is a racing series regulated according to FIA Formula 4. The inaugural season was the 2015–16 edition.

History

Gerhard Berger and the FIA Singleseater Commission launched the FIA Formula 4 in March 2013. The goal of Formula 4 is to make the ladder to Formula 1 more transparent. It involves sporting and technical regulations and regulates costs. Cars competing in this category are not allowed to cost more than €30,000. A single season in a Formula 4 may not exceed €100,000. The Spanish F4 is planned to be the one of the second phase Formula 4 championships. The first phase championships was the Italian F4 Championship and the Formula 4 Sudamericana, which started in 2014. The Chinese championship was launched by Narcar International Racing Development Co., Ltd. on 11 September 2014.

Car
The championship feature cars are designed and built by French race car constructor Mygale. The cars are made  up of carbon fiber and has monocoque chassis. The engine is made up of 2.0 turbo Geely G-Power JLD-4G20.

Champions

Drivers

Teams

Circuits 

 Bold denotes a circuit used in the 2022 season.

See also 
 China Formula Grand Prix

Notes

References

External links
  
   (archive)

 
Formula racing series
Recurring sporting events established in 2015
Formula 4 series
Auto racing series in China
2015 establishments in China
Formula 4